Dubrow may refer to:

Evelyn Dubrow (1911–2006), labour lobbyist for the International Ladies' Garment Workers' Union
Heather Dubrow (born 1969), American actress and television personality
John Dubrow (born 1958), American painter
Kevin DuBrow (1955–2007), American rock singer who was the lead vocalist of Quiet Riot
Terry Dubrow (born 1958), American plastic surgeon and television personality
Dubrow's Cafeteria, a defunct chain of cafeteria-style restaurants